Muhlenbergia is a genus of plants in the grass family.

The genus is named in honor of the German-American amateur botanist Gotthilf Heinrich Ernst Muhlenberg (1753-1815). Many of the species are known by the common name muhly.
The greatest number are native to the southwestern United States and Mexico, but there are also native species in Canada, Central and South America and in Asia.

Species
Species in the genus include:

 Muhlenbergia aguascalientensis Y.Herrera & De la Cerda - Aguascalientes
 Muhlenbergia alamosae Vasey - Aguascalientes, Chihuahua, Sonora, Sinaloa, Durango, Baja California, Baja California Sur, Guanajuato, Jalisco, Mexico State, Morelos, Zacatecas
 Muhlenbergia andina (Nutt.) Hitchc. – Foxtail muhly - western Canada, western United States
 Muhlenbergia angustata (J.Presl) Kunth - South America
 Muhlenbergia annua (Vasey) Swallen - Chihuahua, Sonora, Chiapas, Durango
 Muhlenbergia appressa C.O.Goodd. – Devil's Canyon muhly - United States (California Arizona), Baja California, Baja California Sur
 Muhlenbergia arenacea (Buckley) Hitchc. - United States (Colorado New Mexico Texas Arizona), Chihuahua, Sonora, Coahuila, San Luis Potosí, Zacatecas
 Muhlenbergia arenicola Buckley - United States (Arizona New Mexico Texas Oklahoma Kansas Colorado), Mexico, Argentina
 Muhlenbergia argentea Vasey - Mexico
 Muhlenbergia arizonica Scribn. United States (New Mexico Arizona), Mexico
 Muhlenbergia arsenei Hitchc.  - United States (California Nevada Utah Arizona New Mexico), Mexico
 Muhlenbergia articulata Scribn. - Mexico
 Muhlenbergia asperifolia (Nees & Meyen ex Trin.) Parodi – Scratchgrass - from Canada to Chile
 Muhlenbergia atacamensis Parodi - Argentina, Bolivia
 Muhlenbergia aurea Swallen  - Guatemala
 Muhlenbergia biloba Hitchc. - Mexico
 Muhlenbergia brandegeei C.Reeder - Baja California
 Muhlenbergia breviaristata (Hack.) Parodi - Argentina
 Muhlenbergia breviculmis Swallen - Guatemala
 Muhlenbergia brevifolia Scribn. ex Beal - Mexico
 Muhlenbergia breviligula Hitchc. - southern Mexico, Guatemala, Honduras, Nicaragua
 Muhlenbergia brevis Goodd. - United States (Arizona New Mexico Texas Colorado), Mexico
 Muhlenbergia breviseta E.Fourn. - Mexico
 Muhlenbergia brevivaginata Swallen - Mexico
 Muhlenbergia bushii R.W.Pohl - central + eastern United States
 Muhlenbergia californica Vasey – California muhly - California (San Bernardino, Riverside, + Los Angeles Counties)
 Muhlenbergia capillaris  – Hairawn muhly  - United States (from Texas to Massachusetts; Mexico, Guatemala, Bahamas, Cuba, Puerto Rico
 Muhlenbergia capillipes (M.E.Jones) P.M.Peterson & Annable - northeastern Mexico
 Muhlenbergia caxamarcensis Laegaard & Sánchez Vega - Peru
 Muhlenbergia ciliata (Kunth) Kunth  - from central Mexico to northwestern Argentina
 Muhlenbergia crispiseta Hitchc. - western Texas, northern Mexico
 Muhlenbergia cualensis Y.Herrera & P.M.Peterson - southern Mexico
 Muhlenbergia curtifolia Scribn.  - Arizona Nevada Utah Wyoming
 Muhlenbergia curtisetosa (Scribn.) Bush - from Ontario to Texas
 Muhlenbergia curviaristata (Ohwi) Ohwi - Japan, Manchuria, Kuril Islands
 Muhlenbergia cuspidata (Torr. ex Hook.) Rydb.  – Plains muhly - from Alberta to Virginia
 Muhlenbergia decumbens Swallen - central Mexico
 Muhlenbergia depauperata Scribn. - United States (Arizona New Mexico Colorado Utah Texas), northeastern Mexico
 Muhlenbergia distichophylla (J.Presl) Kunth  - Mexico, Guatemala
 Muhlenbergia diversiglumis Trin. - from northern Mexico to Peru
 Muhlenbergia dubia E.Fourn. - Arizona New Mexico Texas, Mexico
 Muhlenbergia dumosa  – Bamboo muhly - Mexico, Arizona
 Muhlenbergia durangensis Y.Herrera - Durango
 Muhlenbergia duthieana Hack. - Pakistan, Nepal, Kashmir, Himanchal Pradesh, Uttaranchal
 Muhlenbergia elongata Scribn. ex Beal - Arizona (Pima + Santa Cruz Counties), northern Mexico
 Muhlenbergia eludens C.Reeder - United States (Arizona New Mexico Texas), northern Mexico
 Muhlenbergia emersleyi Vasey – Bullgrass - United States (Arizona Nevada New Mexico Texas North Carolina), Mexico, Guatemala, Honduras
 Muhlenbergia eriophylla Swallen - Mexico
 Muhlenbergia expansa  – Cutover muhly - United States (Texas Oklahoma Louisiana Mississippi Alabama Georgia Florida South Carolina North Carolina Virginia Massachusetts)
 Muhlenbergia fastigiata (J.Presl) Henrard - Bolivia, Peru, Colombia, Chile, Argentina
 Muhlenbergia filiculmis Vasey - United States (Arizona New Mexico Utah Colorado Wyoming North Dakota)
 Muhlenbergia filiformis (Thurb. ex S.Watson) Rydb.  – Pullup muhly - western United States, British Columbia, Sonora, Baja California
 Muhlenbergia flabellata Mez - Costa Rica, Panamá
 Muhlenbergia flavida Vasey - Mexico
 Muhlenbergia flaviseta Scribn. - Mexico
 Muhlenbergia flexuosa Hitchc. - Peru
 Muhlenbergia fragilis Swallen - Mexico, United States (California Nevada Utah Arizona New Mexico Texas)
 Muhlenbergia frondosa (Poir.) Fernald - eastern + central United States + Canada
 Muhlenbergia gigantea (E.Fourn.) Hitchc. - Mexico
 Muhlenbergia glabriflora Scribn. - south-central United States
 Muhlenbergia glauca (Nees) Mez - Mexico, United States (California Arizona New Mexico Texas)
 Muhlenbergia glomerata (Willd.) Trin. – Marsh muhly, spiked muhly - northern United States, Canada including Yukon + NWT
 Muhlenbergia grandis Vasey - Mexico
 Muhlenbergia gypsophila C.Reeder & Reeder - Mexico
 Muhlenbergia hakonensis (Hack.) Makino - China (Sichuan, Anhui), Korea, Japan
 Muhlenbergia himalayensis Hack. ex Hook.f. - Afghanistan, northern Pakistan, Tajikistan, northern + eastern India, Tibet, Nepal, Bhutan, Sichuan, Yunnan
 Muhlenbergia hintonii Swallen - Mexico
 Muhlenbergia huegelii Trin. - widespread from Afghanistan to Primorye to New Guinea, including India + China
 Muhlenbergia implicata (Kunth) Trin. - Mesoamerica, Colombia, Venezuela
 Muhlenbergia inaequalis Soderstr.  - Colombia, Venezuela
 Muhlenbergia involuta Swallen - Texas
 Muhlenbergia iridifolia Soderstr. - Mexico
 Muhlenbergia jaime-hintonii P.M.Peterson & Valdés-Reyna - Mexico
 Muhlenbergia jaliscana Swallen - Mexico
 Muhlenbergia japonica Steud. - China, Japan, Korea, Primorye, Khabarovsk
 Muhlenbergia jonesii (Vasey) Hitchc. - northeastern California
 Muhlenbergia laxa Hitchc. - Veracruz
 Muhlenbergia lehmanniana Henrard - Costa Rica, Panama, Colombia, Venezuela. Ecuador
 Muhlenbergia ligularis (Hack.) Hitchc.  - from Costa Rica to Argentina
 Muhlenbergia ligulata (E.Fourn.) Scribn. & Merr. - Mexico
 Muhlenbergia lindheimeri Hitchc. – Lindheimer muhly, big muhly - Texas, Coahuila
 Muhlenbergia longiglumis Vasey - Mexico
 Muhlenbergia longiligula Hitchc. - Mexico, United States (Arizona New Mexico Texas Nevada)
 Muhlenbergia lucida Swallen - Mexico
 Muhlenbergia macroura (Humb., Bonpl. & Kunth) Hitchc. - Mexico, Guatemala
 Muhlenbergia majalcensis P.M.Peterson - Mexico
 Muhlenbergia maxima Laegaard & Sánchez Vega - Peru
 Muhlenbergia mexicana (L.) Trin. – Mexican muhly - United States, Canada incl. Yukon
 Muhlenbergia michisensis Y.Herrera & P.M.Peterson - Mexico
 Muhlenbergia microsperma  (District of Columbia.) Kunth – Littleseed muhly - United States (California Arizona Nevada Utah), Mexico, Guatemala, Colombia, Venezuela, Ecuador, Peru, Galápagos, Bolivia
 Muhlenbergia minutissima (Steud.) Swallen – Annual muhly - United States (Washington Oregon California Idaho Montana Wyoming Nebraska South Dakota Utah Nevada Arizona New Mexico Texas), Mexico, Guatemala
 Muhlenbergia monandra Alegría & Rúgolo - Peru
 Muhlenbergia montana  (Nutt.) Hitchc. – Mountain muhly - United States (Montana Wyoming Colorado Utah Nevada Arizona California New Mexico Texas), Mexico
 Muhlenbergia mucronata (Kunth) Trin. - Mexico
 Muhlenbergia multiflora Columbus - western United States
 Muhlenbergia mutica (E.Fourn.) Hitchc. - Mexico
 Muhlenbergia nigra Hitchc. - Mexico, Costa Rica, Guatemala
 Muhlenbergia orophila Swallen - Mexico, Guatemala
 Muhlenbergia palmeri Vasey - Mexico, southern Arizona
 Muhlenbergia palmirensis Grignon & Lægaard - Ecuador
 Muhlenbergia paniculata (Nutt.) P.M.Peterson - central Canada, central + western United States, northeastern Mexico, northern Argentina
 Muhlenbergia pauciflora Buckley - United States (Colorado Utah Texas New Mexico Arizona California), Mexico
 Muhlenbergia pectinata Goodd. - Mexico, southern Arizona
 Muhlenbergia peruviana  – Peruvian muhly - United States (Arizona New Mexico), Mesoamerica, western South America, Galápagos
 Muhlenbergia pilosa P.M.Peterson, Wipff & S.D.Jones - México State, Guerrero
 Muhlenbergia plumbea (Trin.) Hitchc. - Mexico, Guatemala
 Muhlenbergia polycaulis Scribn. - United States (Utah Texas New Mexico Arizona), Mexico
 Muhlenbergia porteri Scribn. ex Beal – Bush muhly - United States (Colorado Oklahoma Utah Nevada Texas New Mexico Arizona California), Mexico
 Muhlenbergia pubescens (Humb., Bonpl. & Kunth) Hitchc. - Mexico
 Muhlenbergia pubigluma Swallen - Mexico
 Muhlenbergia pungens Thurb. – Sandhill muhly  - United States (Nebraska South Dakota Colorado Wyoming Arizona Utah New Mexico Texas)
 Muhlenbergia purpusii Mez - Mexico
 Muhlenbergia quadridentata (Kunth) Trin. - Mexico, Guatemala
 Muhlenbergia racemosa (Michx.) Britton, Sterns & Poggenb. – Green muhly, marsh muhly
 Muhlenbergia ramosa (Hack.) Makino - Canada, United States, northern Mexico
 Muhlenbergia ramulosa (Humb., Bonpl. & Kunth) Swallen - United States (Arizona New Mexico Colorado), Mesoamerica, Argentina
 Muhlenbergia reederorum Soderstr.  - Mexico
 Muhlenbergia repens (J.Presl) Hitchc. - Mexico, United States (Arizona New Mexico Texas Colorado Oklahoma Utah)
 Muhlenbergia reverchonii  – Seep muhly - United States (Texas Oklahoma)
 Muhlenbergia richardsonis  – Mat muhly - Canada (incl Yukon + NWT), United States (Alaska plus northern + western states), northern + central Mexico
 Muhlenbergia rigens  – Deergrass - Mexico, United States (California Nevada Arizona New Mexico Texas)
 Muhlenbergia rigida (Kunth) Kunth - United States (Arizona New Mexico Texas), Mexico, South America (Colombia to Argentina)
 Muhlenbergia robusta (E.Fourn.) Hitchc. - Mexico, Central America
 Muhlenbergia schmitzii Hack. - Mexico
 Muhlenbergia schreberi  – Nimblewill - eastern + central United States, Ontario, Mexico, Uruguay, southern Brazil, northern Argentina
 Muhlenbergia scoparia Vasey - Mexico
 Muhlenbergia seatonii Scribn. ex Seaton - Mexico
 Muhlenbergia sericea (Michx.) P.M.Peterson  United States (Texas Alabama Florida Georgia Louisiana Mississippi North Carolina South Carolina)
 Muhlenbergia setarioides E.Fourn. - Mexico, Central America
 Muhlenbergia setifolia Vasey - United States (Arizona New Mexico Texas), Mexico
 Muhlenbergia sinuosa Swallen - United States (Arizona New Mexico), Mexico
 Muhlenbergia sobolifera (Muhl.) Trin. - eastern + central United States, Ontario
 Muhlenbergia spatha Columbus - Mexico
 Muhlenbergia speciosa Vasey - Mexico
 Muhlenbergia spiciformis Trin. - Mexico, Cuba, United States (New Mexico Texas)
 Muhlenbergia straminea Hitchc. - Mexico, United States (New Mexico Arizona Texas)
 Muhlenbergia stricta (J.Presl) Kunth  - Mexico
 Muhlenbergia strictior Beal - Mexico
 Muhlenbergia subaristata Swallen - Mexico
 Muhlenbergia subbiflora Hitchc. - Mexico
 Muhlenbergia sylvatica  – Woodland muhly - eastern + central United States, Quebec, Ontario
 Muhlenbergia tarahumara P.M.Peterson & Columbus - Mexico
 Muhlenbergia tenella (Kunth) Trin. - Mexico, Central America, Colombia, Argentina
 Muhlenbergia tenuiflora (Willd.) Britton, Stern & Poggenb. - eastern + central United States, Quebec, Ontario
 Muhlenbergia tenuifolia (Kunth) Kunth - United States (Texas New Mexico Arizona Colorado), Mexico, Peru, Argentina
 Muhlenbergia tenuissima (J.Presl) Kunth - Mexico, Central America
 Muhlenbergia texana Buckley - Mexico, United States (Arizona New Mexico Texas)
 Muhlenbergia thurberi (Scribn.) Rydb. - Mexico, United States (Texas New Mexico Arizona Colorado Utah Nevada)
 Muhlenbergia torreyana (Schult.) Hitchc. – New Jersey muhly, Torrey's muhly, Torrey's dropseed - New Jersey New York Delaware Maryland North Carolina Tennessee Georgia
 Muhlenbergia torreyi (Kunth) Hitchc. ex Bush - southwestern United States, Mexico, Argentina
 Muhlenbergia trifida Hack. - Mexico, Guatemala
 Muhlenbergia uniflora (Muhl.) Fernald - Canada, northeastern United States
 Muhlenbergia utilis (Torr.) Hitchc. – Aparejograss - Mexico, United States (California Nevada Arizona New Mexico Texas)
 Muhlenbergia vaginata Swallen - Mexico, Guatemala
 Muhlenbergia venezuelae Luces - Mérida State in Venezuela
 Muhlenbergia versicolor Swallen - Mexico, Guatemala, Honduras
 Muhlenbergia villiflora Hitchc. - Mexico, United States (New Mexico Texas)
 Muhlenbergia virescens (Kunth) Kunth - Mexico
 Muhlenbergia virletii (E.Fourn.) Soderstr. - Mexico
 Muhlenbergia watsoniana Hitchc. - Mexico
 Muhlenbergia wrightii Vasey ex J.M.Coult. - Mexico, United States (Nevada Utah Colorado Arizona New Mexico Texas Texas Kansas)
 Muhlenbergia xanthodas Soderstr. - Chiapas

Numerous species are now considered better suited to other genera, such as Aegopogon, Apera, Arundinella, Brachyelytrum, Calamagrostis, Chaetopogon, Cinna, Dichelachne, Garnotia, Limnodea, Lycurus, Melinis, Ortachne, Pereilema, Sporobolus, Triniochloa.

References

External links

Jepson Manual Treatment
USDA Plants Profile
Interactive Key to Muhlenbergia of North America

 
Poaceae genera
Taxonomy articles created by Polbot